Glen Little is a Canadian politician in Newfoundland and Labrador. Little was elected to the Newfoundland and Labrador House of Assembly in the 2011 provincial election. A member of the Progressive Conservative Party of Newfoundland and Labrador, he represented the electoral district of Bonavista South from 2011 until 2015. In the 2015 provincial election, Little ran in the redistributed district of Bonavista, but lost to Liberal Neil King.

Electoral record

|-

|-

|-

|-

|}

|-

|-

|NDP
|Darryl Johnson
|align="right"|1,198
|align="right"|30.38%
|align="right"|
|-

|}

References

External links
 PC Party biography

Living people
Progressive Conservative Party of Newfoundland and Labrador MHAs
21st-century Canadian politicians
Year of birth missing (living people)